The Augusta Electrical Generating Plant is a historic power station at the southwest corner of 5th and Locust Streets in Augusta, Arkansas.  It is a single-story brick building, with a multi-section corrugated metal roof and a concrete foundation.  One portion of the roof has a gable-on-hip configuration, while the other section is hipped.  The main portion of the building dates to about 1905 by the city as part of its early push for electrification.  The building was expanded several times until the early 1940s, when it achieved its present form.

The building was listed on the National Register of Historic Places in 2010, where it is incorrectly listed at 5th and Spruce Streets.

See also
National Register of Historic Places listings in Woodruff County, Arkansas

References

Industrial buildings and structures on the National Register of Historic Places in Arkansas
Energy infrastructure completed in 1905
1905 establishments in Arkansas
National Register of Historic Places in Woodruff County, Arkansas
Energy infrastructure on the National Register of Historic Places
Former power stations in the United States
Augusta, Arkansas